Helmut Buschbom (April 24, 1921 – January 16, 2017) was a German politician of the Christian Democratic Union (CDU) and former member of the German Bundestag.

Life 
Buschbom had been a member of the CDU since 1957. Helmut Buschbom succeeded Richard von Weizsäcker in the German Bundestag on 16 June 1981 and was a member until the end of the 11th parliamentary term on 22 December 1990.

Literature

References

1921 births
2017 deaths
Members of the Bundestag for Berlin
Members of the Bundestag 1987–1990
Members of the Bundestag 1983–1987
Members of the Bundestag 1980–1983
Members of the Bundestag for the Christian Democratic Union of Germany